Isshiki (written: 一色) is a Japanese surname. Notable people with the surname include:

, Japanese manga artist
, Japanese actress
, Japanese samurai and daimyō
, Japanese samurai and daimyō

Fictional characters:
Akane Isshiki, protagonist of the anime series Vividred Operation
Iroha Isshiki, a character in My Teen Romantic Comedy SNAFU
Makoto Isshiki, a character in RahXephon
Satoshi Isshiki, a character in Food Wars!: Shokugeki no Soma

See also
Isshiki clan
Isshiki, Aichi, former town in Aichi Prefecture, Japan

Japanese-language surnames